Afanasy Nikitin (died 1472) was a Russian merchant from Tver and one of the first Europeans (after Niccolò de' Conti) to travel to and document his visit to India.  He described his trip in a narrative known as The Journey Beyond Three Seas (Khozhdeniye za tri morya).

The voyage

In 1466 Nikitin left his hometown of Tver on a commercial trip to India. He travelled down the Volga River, and although Tatars attacked and robbed him near Astrakhan, he succeeded in reaching Derbent, where he joined Vasili Papin, the envoy of Ivan the Great (the Grand Prince of All Rus') to the shah of Shirvan. At Derbent, Nikitin vainly endeavoured to find means of returning to Russia; failing in this, he went on to Baku and later to Persia proper by crossing the Caspian Sea. He lived in Persia for one year. In the spring of 1469, Nikitin arrived at the city of Ormus and then, crossing the Arabian Sea, and making several prolonged stays along the way, reached the sultanate of Bahmani, where he would live for three years. From what he tells us, he appears to have made his living by horse-dealing. During that time he visited the Hindu sanctuary of Perwattum, which he called "the Jerusalem of the Hindus".

On his way back, Nikitin visited  Muscat, the Arabian sultanate of Somalia, and Trabzon. In 1472 he arrived at Feodosiya by crossing the Black Sea. On his way to Tver, Nikitin died not far from Smolensk in the autumn of that year.

During his trip, Nikitin studied the population of India, its social system, government, military (he witnessed war-games featuring war elephants), its  economy, religion, lifestyles, and natural resources.  The abundance and trustworthiness of Nikitin's factual material provide a valuable source of information about India at that time, and his remarks on the trade of  Hormuz,  Cambay, Calicut, Dabhol,  Ceylon, Pegu and China; on  royal progresses and other functions, both ecclesiastical and civil, at Bahmani, and on the wonders of the great fair at Perwattumas well as his comparisons of things Russian and Indiandeserve special notice.|

Religion

After studying Nikitin's account, and especially his references to Islam (much of India was ruled by Muslim sultans, and many Muslim merchants lived along the coast), particularly the prayers he transliterates from Arabic and Turkic into Cyrillic letters, Gail Lenhoff and Janet Martin speculated that Nikitin might have converted to Islam in India.

His loss of contact with Christianity and his life among Muslims (and apparent lapse from Christianity and conversion to Islam) bothered him, as he mentioned several times in his account. Indeed, he began his account calling it his "sinful voyage beyond three seas."  He went on to explain that he continued to date events by Christian religious holidays and invoked the Mother of God and the saints ("the Holy Fathers"), he could not remember when Christian holidays were and so he could not celebrate Easter and other movable feast days or keep the Christian fasts (Lent, the St. Peters' Fast, the fast during Advent, etc.). Thus, he kept the fasts of the Muslims and broke fast when they did so. He also wrote that at Bindar in the third year of his journey he "shed many tears for the Christian faith". Very near the end of his account, he wrote of his wish to return home and to the Christian faith: "I, Afanasy, a damned servant of Almighty God, Maker of heaven and earth, pondered over the Christian faith, the Baptism of Christ, the fasts established by the Holy Fathers, and the apostolic commandments, and I longed to go [back] to Rus!"

Yakov Lurye, an editor of Nikitin's Journey, sees his conversion as doubtful, pointing out that a circumcised convert should be persecuted or even put to death in Rus', so if Nikitin had indeed become a Muslim, he would have avoided returning to his country, while in fact he died on his way back in Lithuania not far from the Muscovite border.

Nikitin in modern memory

In 1955, the local authorities of Tver erected a bronze monument to Afanasy Nikitin on the bank of the Volga River.  The sculptor was Sergei Orlov.  There is a folk legend that this statue was raised because Nikita Khrushchev, upon visiting India, told Prime Minister Jawaharlal Nehru that there was a statue of Nikitin in Russia when in fact there was not (Nehru had asked if the Russians had honored the first Russian to visit India). So as not to be proven a liar, Khrushchev phoned back to Russia demanding that a statue of Nikitin be built immediately, before Nehru's state visit to Russia. The statue was featured on a Russian postage stamp in 2005 commemorating the 75th Anniversary of the establishment of the Tver region (oblast).  Nikitin was also featured on a coin commemorating the 525th anniversary of his journey.

In 1958, the Russian state-owned Mosfilm Studio and Indian director Khwaja Ahmad Abbas' "Naya Sansar International" production house co-produced a film entitled The Journey Beyond Three Seas with Oleg Strizhenov cast as Nikitin.

In 2000, a black obelisk was erected in Nikitin's honor at Revdanda, 120 km south of Mumbai, the probable location where he first set foot in India.

In 2006, the Indian organization Adventures & Explorers, with the support of the Embassy of India in Moscow and the Tver Regional Administration sponsored a Nikitin Expedition, in which 14 travelers set out from Tver to retrace Nikitin's journey through Russia, the Middle East, and Central Asia to India. The expedition lasted from 12 November 2006 to 16 January 2007. The Indian newspaper The Hindu filed several reports on the expedition's progress. After reaching India, two members of the expedition set out in March 2007 from Mumbai in SUVs to retrace Nikitin's travels around India itself.

The Afanasy Nikitin Seamount in the Indian Ocean is named in his honor.

On 17 April 2022,The Kozhikode Corporation  paid tribute to  Afanasy Nikitin, commemorating the 550th anniversary of his visit to Kozhikode. Moreover, Customs Road in the city was renamed after Nikitin, also establishing a ‘twin city’ status with Tver, the birth place of Nikitin.

In culture
Rock band Aquarium composed a song "Afanasy Nikitin Boogie". Power metal band Epidemia composed a song "Хождение за три моря" (Khozhdeniye za tri morya – "Walking the Three Seas") about Nikitin's writings. A brand of Tver beer, "Afanasy", is named after Afanasy Nikitin.

See also
Daniel Kievsky
Chronology of European exploration of Asia
Niccolò de' Conti (1385–1469) - another European who traveled to India a few decades before Nikitin
some marginal notes on india:sergei d serebriany

References

Sources
 
 M. J. Maxwell. Afanasii Nikitin: An Orthodox Russian's Spiritual Voyage in the Dar al-Islam, 1468-1475. Journal of World History. Vol. 17, No. 3 (Sep., 2006)
 J. Speake (ed.) Literature of Travel and Exploration: An Encyclopedia. Volume 1, A to F. Routledge. 2013
 C. H. Whittaker. Russia engages the world, 1453-1825. Harvard University Press, 2003. P. 141
 The new Encyclopædia Britannica: in 32 vol. Macropaedia, India - Ireland, Volume 21. 1992. P. 183
 Afanasy Nikitin's Voyage Beyond Three Seas: 1466-1472. Raduga, 1985
 J. Burbank, M. Von Hagen, A. V. Remnev. Russian Empire: Space, People, Power, 1700-1930. Indiana University Press. 2007. P. 240
 A. V. Riasanovsky. Afanasii Nikitin's Journal. Journal of the American Oriental Society, Volume 81. 1961.
 J. R. Millar. Encyclopedia of Russian History, Volume 1. Macmillan Reference, 2003. P. 93

Explorers of Asia
Russian explorers
Russian travel writers
1472 deaths
Year of birth unknown
People from Tver
15th-century Russian people
15th-century writers
15th-century Russian writers
15th-century merchants
Russian merchants
Explorers of India
Russian expatriates in India